Milly-sur-Thérain is a railway station located in the commune of Milly-sur-Thérain in the Oise department, France. It is on the Épinay-Villetaneuse–Le Tréport-Mers railway line and is served by TER Hauts-de-France trains from Beauvais to Le Tréport.

History
Milly-sur-Thérain was formerly the interchange station for a metre gauge local-interest line which ran through the Thérain valley to Formerie. Opened on 22 October 1894, this line was closed to all traffic on 31 December 1935.

In 2009, as part of the modernisation of the line between Beauvais and Abancourt, the station was made accessible to mobility-challenged people.

See also 
 List of SNCF stations in Hauts-de-France

References
 

Railway stations in Oise
Railway stations in France opened in 1875